is a 1984 Japanese comedy film by director Juzo Itami.

The film shows the preparations for a traditional Japanese funeral.  It mixes grief at the loss of a husband and father with wry observations of the various characters as they interact during the three days of preparation.

The Funeral was the writing and directing debut of Itami Juzo, and was an enormous success in Japan.  It won five Japanese Academy Awards in 1985, including Best Film, Best Director and Best Actor for Tsutomu Yamazaki. It was nominated in a further five categories and also came first in the annual Kinema Junpo critics' poll.

Plot
Shinkichi Amamiya (Hideji Otaki) is a difficult 69-year-old man, married to Kikue (Kin Sugai).  He dies suddenly of a heart attack, and it falls to his daughter Chizuko (Nobuko Miyamoto) and son-in-law Wabisuke Inoue (Tsutomu Yamazaki) to organize the funeral at their house.

Among other things, the family have to choose a coffin, hire a priest, hold a wake, learn formal funeral etiquette and hold the service itself.

During the three days of preparation, various tensions within the family are hinted at, such as resentment of a rich but stingy uncle, Inoue's affair with a younger woman, and possibly an affair the dead man himself had with a female gateball player.

After the service, the long-suffering wife delivers a dignified speech to the family regretting that the hospital would not let her be with her husband as he died.

References

External links

New York Times review
1994 LA Times review

1984 films
1980s Japanese-language films
Japanese sex comedy films
1984 directorial debut films
Films directed by Jūzō Itami
Picture of the Year Japan Academy Prize winners
1980s sex comedy films
Best Film Kinema Junpo Award winners
1984 comedy films
Films about funerals
1980s Japanese films